Realitatea FM or RFM is a radio station based in Bucharest. It is a talk-show/news radio station, part of Realitatea-Catavencu media group. They are broadcasting on:

 București 90.2 FM
 Sibiu 90.4 FM
 Sulina 107 FM
 Constanța 98.9 FM

Radio stations in Romania
Romanian-language radio stations
Mass media in Bucharest